The Young Rebel may refer to

 The Young Rebel (1963 film), directed by Seijun Suzuki.
 The Young Rebel (1967 film), directed by Vincent Sherman and it's about Miguel de Cervantes.